U.S. Highway 57 (US 57) is a  north–south intrastate United States highway that follows a nearly east–west route in the southwestern part of the U.S. state of Texas. Its southern (western) terminus is in Eagle Pass, at the Rio Grande (Río Bravo), where it continues into Piedras Negras, Coahuila, as Mexican Federal Highway 57.

History
This  highway was originally designated in 1933 as Texas State Highway 76, which was previously designated in 1926 on a route from Nacogdoches to Joaquin which was replaced by SH 7 in 1933. From 1942 to 1964, its eastern half was reassigned to Farm to Market Road 394 (FM 394). In 1966, the state changed the highway's number to 57 to provide continuity with Mexican Federal Highway 57, a similarly-numbered route across the Mexican border.

In 1970, the highway was commissioned as a United States Highway, and retained its "57" designation to create a single-numbered international corridor. The highway is signed south–north, even though it travels much closer to an east-west direction. However, Mexican Federal Highway 57 travels south to Mexico City, so the unusual directional signing prevents confusion.

Route description
US 57 begins at the Eagle Pass – Piedras Negras International Bridge in Eagle Pass. The highway travels eastward through Eagle Pass on Garrison Street. On the east side of town, it turns northeast briefly and intersects US 277 Business on Main Street before turning back to the east. Six blocks later, it reaches the intersection with the main branch of US 277 and FM 3443. US 57 continues east, now concurrent with southbound US 277. About  further, the highways diverge, with US 57 veering to the northeast. The highway travels through ranchland in Maverick County and travels through a United States Border Patrol interior checkpoint before reaching La Pryor, where it intersects US 83. US 57 continues eastward through Batesville and unincorporated areas of Zavala and Frio counties, intersecting several Farm to Market roads, before reaching its eastern terminus at Interstate 35 (I-35) southwest of the town of Moore.

Major intersections

See also

References

External links

 Endpoints of US highway 57

57
57
Transportation in Maverick County, Texas
Transportation in Frio County, Texas
Transportation in Zavala County, Texas